The Hawke's Bay Province was a province of New Zealand. The province separated from the Wellington Province following a meeting in Napier in February 1858, and existed until the abolition of provincial government in 1876. At the time of its establishment in 1858, the European population of the provincial district was only 1,185.

History
One of the earliest European settlers in the area was William Colenso, and had his mission station at Port Ahuriri, the port of Napier. At a meeting in Napier in February 1858, the decision was made to split Hawke's Bay from the Wellington Province, which took effect in November of that year.

The province had its own elected Superintendent and provincial council. The provincial council sat at Napier. 

In 1863, the province was described in The Illustrated London News as "one of the principal grazing districts in the colony; it possesses abundance of fine agricultural land, and has a climate proverbially mild and healthy." The article goes on to estimate the population at 3,600 Maori and 2,600 settlers.

The system of provincial government was abolished in 1876.

Area
By 1856, 30 sheep stations existed in Hawke's Bay, located mainly on those two blocks of land. Donald McLean organised further land purchases.

The capital of the province was Napier.

Anniversary day
New Zealand law provides an anniversary day for each province. Hawke's Bay Province was founded on 1 November 1858.

Superintendents

The Hawke's Bay Province had four Superintendents:

Legislation
There is no surviving legislation from the Hawke's Bay Provincial Council.

References

External links
 Page containing a map of the old provincial boundaries
 Hawke's Bay (Te Ara)
 The Seal of Hawke's Bay

Provinces of New Zealand
States and territories established in 1858
1876 disestablishments in New Zealand
1858 establishments in New Zealand